Starvation is a severe deficiency in caloric energy intake, below the level needed to maintain an organism's life. It is the most extreme form of malnutrition. In humans, prolonged starvation can cause permanent organ damage and eventually, death. The term inanition refers to the symptoms and effects of starvation. Starvation may also be used as a means of torture or execution.

According to the World Health Organization (WHO), hunger is the single gravest threat to the world's public health. The WHO also states that malnutrition is by far the biggest contributor to child mortality, present in half of all cases. Undernutrition is a contributory factor in the death of 3.1 million children under five every year. Figures on actual starvation are difficult to come by, but according to the Food and Agriculture Organization, the less severe condition of undernourishment currently affects about 842 million people, or about one in eight (12.5%) people in the world population.

The bloated stomach represents a form of malnutrition called kwashiorkor. The exact pathogenesis of kwashiorkor is not clear, as initially it was thought to relate to diets high in carbohydrates (e.g. maize) but low in protein. While many patients have low albumin, this is thought to be a consequence of the condition. Possible causes such as aflatoxin poisoning, oxidative stress, immune dysregulation, and altered gut microbiota have been suggested. Treatment can help mitigate symptoms such as the pictured weight loss and muscle wasting, however prevention is of utmost importance.

Without any food, humans usually die in around 2 months. There was a surprising case when someone survived 382 days. Lean people can usually survive with a loss of up to 18% of their body mass. Obese people can tolerate more, possibly over 20%. Females survive longer than males.

Signs and symptoms

The following are some of the symptoms of starvation:

Changes in behaviour or mental status 
The beginning stages of starvation impact mental status and behaviours. These symptoms show up as irritable mood, fatigue, trouble concentrating, and preoccupation with food thoughts. People with those symptoms tend to be easily distracted and have no energy.

Physical signs 
As starvation progresses, the physical symptoms set in. The timing of these symptoms depends on age, size, and overall health. It usually takes days to weeks, and includes weakness, fast heart rate, shallow breaths that are slowed, thirst, and constipation. There may also be diarrhea in some cases. The eyes begin to sink in and glass over. The muscles begin to become smaller and muscle wasting sets in. One prominent sign in children is a swollen belly. Skin loosens and turns pale in color, and there may be swelling of the feet and ankles.

Weakened immune system 
Symptoms of starvation may also appear as a weakened immune system, slow wound healing, and poor response to infection. Rashes may develop on the skin. The body directs any nutrients available to keeping organs functioning.

Other symptoms 
Other effects of starvation may include:

 Anemia
 Gallstones
 Hypotension
 Stomach disease
 Cardiovascular and respiratory diseases
 Irregular or absent menstrual periods in women
 Kidney disease or failure
 Electrolyte imbalance
 Emaciation
 Oliguria

Stages of starvation 
The symptoms of starvation show up in three stages. Phase one and two can show up in anyone that skips meals, diets, and goes through fasting. Phase three is more severe, can be fatal, and results from long-term starvation.

Phase one: When meals are skipped, the body begins to maintain blood sugar levels by degrading glycogen in the liver and breaking down stored fat and protein. The liver can provide glucose for the first few hours. After that, the body begins to break down fat and protein. The body uses Fatty acids as an energy source for muscles but lowers the amount of glucose sent to the brain. Another chemical that comes from fatty acids is glycerol. It can be used as glucose for energy but eventually runs out.

Phase two: Phase two can last for weeks at a time. In this phase, the body mainly uses stored fat for energy. The breakdown occurs in the liver and turns fat into ketones. After fasting for one week, the brain will use these ketones and any available glucose. Using ketones lowers the need for glucose, and the body slows the breakdown of proteins.

Phase three: By this point, the fat stores are gone, and the body begins to turn to stored protein for energy. This means it needs to break down muscle tissues full of protein; the muscles break down very quickly. Protein is essential for cells to work correctly, and when it runs out, the cells can no longer function.

The cause of death due to starvation is usually an infection or the result of tissue breakdown. This is due to the body becoming unable to produce enough energy to fight off bacteria and viruses. The final stage of starvation includes signals like hair color loss, skin flaking, swelling in the extremities, and a bloated belly. Even though they may feel hunger, people in the final stage of starvation usually cannot eat enough food to recover.

Causes
The body expends more energy than it takes in. This imbalance can arise from one or more medical conditions or circumstantial situations, which can include:

Medical reasons
Anorexia nervosa
Bulimia nervosa
Eating disorder, not otherwise specified
Celiac disease
Coma
Major depressive disorder
Diabetes mellitus
Digestive disease
Constant vomiting

Circumstantial causes
Child, elder, or dependant abuse
Famine for any reason, such as political strife and war
Hunger striking
Excessive fasting
Poverty
Torture

Biochemistry

With a typical high-carbohydrate diet, the human body relies on free blood glucose as its primary energy source. Glucose can be obtained directly from dietary sugars and by the breakdown of other carbohydrates. In the absence of dietary sugars and carbohydrates, glucose is obtained from the breakdown of stored glycogen. Glycogen is a readily-accessible storage form of glucose, stored in notable quantities in the liver and skeletal muscle.

After the exhaustion of the glycogen reserve, and for the next two to three days, fatty acids become the principal metabolic fuel. At first, the brain continues to use glucose. If a non-brain tissue is using fatty acids as its metabolic fuel, the use of glucose in the same tissue is switched off.  Thus, when fatty acids are being broken down for energy, all of the remaining glucose is made available for use by the brain.

After two or three days of fasting, the liver begins to synthesize ketone bodies from precursors obtained from fatty acid breakdown. The brain uses these ketone bodies as fuel, thus cutting its requirement for glucose. After fasting for three days, the brain gets 30% of its energy from ketone bodies. After four days, this may increase to 70% or more. Thus, the production of ketone bodies cuts the brain's glucose requirement from 80 g per day to 30 g per day, about 35% of normal, with 65% derived from ketone bodies. But of the brain's remaining 30 g requirement, 20 g per day can be produced by the liver from glycerol (itself a product of fat breakdown). This still leaves a deficit of about 10 g of glucose per day that must be supplied from another source; this other source will be the body's own proteins.

After exhaustion of fat stores, the cells in the body begin to break down protein. This releases alanine and lactate produced from pyruvate, which can be converted into glucose by the liver. Since much of human muscle mass is protein, this phenomenon is responsible for the wasting away of muscle mass seen in starvation. However, the body is able to choose which cells will break down protein and which will not. About 2–3 g of protein has to be broken down to synthesize 1 g of glucose; about 20–30 g of protein is broken down each day to make 10 g of glucose to keep the brain alive. However, this number may decrease the longer the fasting period is continued, in order to conserve protein.

Starvation ensues when the fat reserves are completely exhausted and protein is the only fuel source available to the body. Thus, after periods of starvation, the loss of body protein affects the function of important organs, and death results, even if there are still fat reserves left. In a leaner person, the fat reserves are depleted faster, and the protein, sooner, therefore death occurs sooner.) Ultimately, the cause of death is in general cardiac arrhythmia or cardiac arrest, brought on by tissue degradation and electrolyte imbalances. Conditions like metabolic acidosis may also kill starving people.

Prevention

Starvation can be caused by factors beyond the control of the individual. The Rome Declaration on World Food Security outlines several policies aimed at increasing food security and, consequently, preventing starvation. These include:
Poverty reduction
Prevention of wars and political instability
Food aid
Agricultural sustainability
Reduction of economic inequality

Supporting farmers in areas of food insecurity through such measures as free or subsidized fertilizers and seeds increases food harvest and reduces food prices.

Treatment
Patients that suffer from starvation can be treated, but this must be done cautiously to avoid refeeding syndrome. Rest and warmth must be provided and maintained. Food can be given gradually in small quantities. The quantity of food can be increased over time. Proteins may be administered intravenously to raise the level of serum proteins.  For worse situations, hospice care and opioid medications can be used.

Organizations

Many organizations have been highly effective at reducing starvation in different regions. Aid agencies give direct assistance to individuals, while political organizations pressure political leaders to enact more macro-scale policies that will reduce famine and provide aid.

Statistics

According to estimates by the Food and Agriculture Organization, between 720 and 811 million people were affected by hunger globally in 2020.  This was a decrease from estimated 925 million in 2010 and roughly 1 billion in 2009. In 2007, 923 million people were reported as being undernourished, an increase of 80 million since 1990–92. 
An estimated 820 million people did not have enough to eat in 2018, up from 811 million in the previous year, which is the third year of increase in a row.

As the definitions of starving and malnourished people are different, the number of starving people is different from that of malnourished. Generally, far fewer people are starving than are malnourished.

The proportion of malnourished and starving people in the world has been more or less continually decreasing for at least several centuries. This is due to an increasing supply of food and to overall gains in economic efficiency. In 40 years, the proportion of malnourished people in the developing world has been more than halved. The proportion of starving people has decreased even faster.

Capital punishment

Historically, starvation has been used as a death sentence. From the beginning of civilization to the Middle Ages, people were immured, and died for want of food.

In ancient Greco-Roman societies, starvation was sometimes used to dispose of guilty upper-class citizens, especially erring female members of patrician families. In the year 31, Livilla, the niece and daughter-in-law of Tiberius, was discreetly starved to death by her mother for her adulterous relationship with Sejanus and for her complicity in the murder of her own husband, Drusus the Younger.

Another daughter-in-law of Tiberius, named Agrippina the Elder (a granddaughter of Augustus and the mother of Caligula), also died of starvation, in 33 AD; however, it is unclear if her starvation was self-inflicted.

A son and daughter of Agrippina were also executed by starvation for political reasons; Drusus Caesar, her second son, was put in prison in 33 AD, and starved to death by orders of Tiberius (he managed to stay alive for nine days by chewing the stuffing of his bed); Agrippina's youngest daughter, Julia Livilla, was exiled on an island in 41 by her uncle, Emperor Claudius, and her death by starvation was arranged by the empress Messalina.

It is also possible that Vestal Virgins were starved when found guilty of breaking their vows of celibacy.

Ugolino della Gherardesca, his sons, and other members of his family were immured in the Muda, a tower of Pisa, and starved to death in the thirteenth century. Dante, his contemporary, wrote about Gherardesca in his masterpiece The Divine Comedy.

In Sweden in 1317, King Birger of Sweden imprisoned his two brothers for a coup they had staged several years earlier (Nyköping Banquet). According to legend they died of starvation a few weeks later, since their brother had thrown the prison key in the castle moat.

In Cornwall in the UK in 1671, John Trehenban from St Columb Major was condemned to be starved to death in a cage at Castle An Dinas for the murder of two girls.

The Makah, a Native American tribe inhabiting the Pacific Northwest near the modern border of Canada and the United States, practiced death by starvation as a punishment for slaves.

Concentration camps and ghettos

Many of the prisoners in the Nazi concentration camps were murdered through deliberate maltreatment, disease, starvation, and overwork, or were executed as unfit for labor. Many occupants of ghettos in eastern Europe also starved to death, most notoriously in the Warsaw Ghetto in German-occupied Poland. Prisoners were transported in inhumane conditions by rail freight cars, in which many died before reaching their destination. The prisoners were confined to the cattle cars for days or even weeks, with little or no food or water. Many died of dehydration in the intense heat of summer or froze to death in winter. Nazi concentration camps in Europe from 1933 to 1945 deliberately underfed prisoners, who were at the same time forced to perform heavy labour. Their diet was restricted to watery vegetable soup and a little bread, with little to no dietary fats, proteins or other essential nutrients. Such treatment led to loss of body tissues, and when prisoners became skeletal, the so-called Muselmanns were murdered by gas or bullets when examined by camp doctors.

Starvation was also used as a punishment where victims were locked into a small cell until dead, a process which could take many days.
Saint Maximilian Kolbe, a martyred Polish friar, underwent a sentence of starvation in Auschwitz concentration camp in 1941. Ten prisoners had been condemned to death by starvation in the wake of a successful escape from the camp. Kolbe volunteered to take the place of a man with a wife and children. After two weeks of starvation, Kolbe and three other inmates remained alive; they were then executed with injections of phenol.

See also

2007–2008 world food price crisis
Anorexia mirabilis
Cachexia
Global Hunger Index
Starvation mode
Famine scales
Hunger strike
List of famines
List of people who died of starvation
Marasmus
Protein poisoning

References

Further reading

 
 U.N. Chief: Hunger Kills 17,000 Kids Daily - by CNN
 
 

 
Causes of death
Effects of external causes
Execution methods
Famines
Hunger
Malnutrition
Physical torture techniques
Weight loss
Suicide methods